Lykoudi is a village and a community of the Elassona municipality. Before the 2011 local government reform it was a part of the municipality of Sarantaporo, of which it was a municipal district. The 2011 census recorded 298 inhabitants in the village. The community of Lykoudi covers an area of 20.784 km2.

Economy
The population of Lykoudi is occupied in animal husbandry and agriculture.

History
Lykoudi has a history over 500 years. The settlement is recorded as village and as "Likodi" as well as "Ravyani" in the Ottoman Tahrir Defter number 101 dating to 1521. Lykoudi was burned by German occupation forces in 1943.

Population
According to the 2011 census, the population of the settlement of Lykoudi was 298 people, a decrease of almost 10% compared with the population of the previous census of 2001.

See also
 List of settlements in the Larissa regional unit

References

Populated places in Larissa (regional unit)